James Henry Todd (16 December 1867 – 11 August 1956) was an English first-class cricketer.

Todd was born in December 1867 at Forest Hill, Kent. Todd made his debut in first-class cricket for London County against Leicestershire at Leicester in 1901. He later made two further appearances in first-class cricket in 1906, for W. G. Grace's personal XI against the touring West Indians and Cambridge University, with both matches played at Crystal Palace. In his three first-class matches, Todd scored a total of 66 runs with a high score of 24. Todd died at Marylebone in August 1956.

References

External links

1867 births
1956 deaths
People from Forest Hill, London
English cricketers
London County cricketers
W. G. Grace's XI cricketers